Maxis Tower is a 49-storey,  office skyscraper in Kuala Lumpur City Centre, Kuala Lumpur, Malaysia. The tower serves as headquarters of Maxis Communications and Tanjong Plc Group of Companies.

Maxis Tower was developed by KLCC Properties Holdings Berhad (KLCCP) under Phase 1 of the KLCC project. The building is owned by Impian Klasik Sdn Bhd, in which Tanjong holds a 67% stake and KLCCP holds a 33% stake. Maxis Tower is situated in the northwest corner of the KLCC development, adjacent to the Petronas Twin Towers. As with its neighbouring twin towers, Maxis Tower features an aluminium and glass cladding facade.

See also
List of tallest buildings in Kuala Lumpur

References

External links
 Maxis Website
 Project Review

Office buildings completed in 1998
1998 establishments in Malaysia
Roche-Dinkeloo buildings
Postmodern architecture in Malaysia
Skyscraper office buildings in Kuala Lumpur
20th-century architecture in Malaysia